Taitung, Tai Tung, or variants, may refer to:

 Taitung County (台東縣 or 臺東縣), a county located in eastern Taiwan
 Taitung City (台東市 or 臺東市), the seat of Taitung County
 Taitung Prefecture (臺東直隸州), former prefecture of Taiwan Province

See also
 Taitung Airport (IATA code: TTT ; ICAO code: RCFN), in Taitung, Taitung, Taiwan
 Taitung railway station, rail station in Taitung, Taitung, Taiwan
 Taitung line in Taiwan
 Sunset Peak (Hong Kong) AKA Tai Tung (大東山), third highest peak in Hong Kong
 Taitung County Council
 Taitung County Government
 Tai (disambiguation)
 Tung (disambiguation)